The  San Diego Chargers season was the franchise's fifth season in the National Football League (NFL), and its 15th overall. The team improved on their 2–11–1 record in 1973 and finished 5–9. It was Tommy Prothro's first season as the team's head coach.

Before the season, the team changed from white helmets and powder blue jerseys—which it had had since its inception in 1960—to royal blue helmets and jerseys. Players' uniform numbers were also removed from the helmets. The royal blue would remain through 1984, when the helmets and jerseys became a darker shade of blue (navy blue); that blue became even darker in 1988. The Chargers switched back permanently to modified white helmets in 2007.

NFL Draft

Roster

Regular season

Schedule

Note: Intra-division opponents are in bold text.

Standings

Season summary

Week 1 at Oilers

References

San Diego Chargers
San Diego Chargers seasons
San Diego Chargers f